Dobro Polje is a settlement on the left bank of the Sava River in the Municipality of Radovljica in the Upper Carniola region of Slovenia.

Geography

Dobro Polje is divided into the hamlet of Malo Dobro Polje (literally, 'little Dobro Polje') to the southeast and the main settlement of Veliko Dobro Polje (literally, 'big Dobro Polje') to the northwest. It is located in the lower part of the Brezje Basin. The soil is thin and sandy, limiting agriculture. Peračica Creek, a tributary of the Sava River, flows through a deep bed east of the village.

References

External links 

Dobro Polje at Geopedia

Populated places in the Municipality of Radovljica